Hugo Mejía (21 November 1931 – 2 April 2010) was an Ecuadorian footballer. He played in six matches for the Ecuador national football team in 1963. He was also part of Ecuador's squad for the 1963 South American Championship.

References

External links
 

1931 births
2010 deaths
Ecuadorian footballers
Ecuador international footballers
Place of birth missing
Association football goalkeepers